Eric Schmidt (born 1955) is an American businessman and former Executive Chairman of Alphabet, Inc.

Eric Schmidt may also refer to:

Eric Schmidt (American football), who played for the 2001 North Dakota Fighting Sioux football team
Eric Schmidt(handballer), handballer who participated in 2013–14 EHF Champions League qualifying

See also
Eric Smidt, American businessman, Chairman and CEO of Harbor Freight Tools
Erik Schmidt (disambiguation)
Erich Schmidt (disambiguation)
Eric Schmitt (disambiguation)